This is a list of the flora of Nihoa, an island in the Northwestern Hawaiian Islands, part of the City & County of Honolulu in the U.S. state of Hawaii.  Nihoa is listed in the National Register of Historic Places and protected under the Papahānaumokuākea Marine National Monument.

See also
Hawaiian tropical low shrublands
List of species of the Northwestern Hawaiian Islands

References

External links
 US.fws.gov: Plants of Nihoa
Hawaiiatolls.org: Midway Atolls

Nihoa
Endemic flora of Hawaii
Nihoa